Wilbur may refer to:

Places in the United States
 Wilbur, Indiana, an unincorporated town
 Wilbur, Trenton, New Jersey, a neighborhood in the city of Trenton
 Wilbur, Oregon, an unincorporated community
 Wilbur, Washington, a small farming town
 Wilbur, West Virginia

Other uses
 Wilbur (name)
 The codename given to the HTML 3.2 standard
 Wilbur (comics), a long-running comic book published by Archie Comics from 1944 to 1965
 Wilbur (Kookmeyer), cartoon strip about a 'kook' (poser surfer) created by Bob Penuelas, which first appeared in Surfer magazine in 1986
 Wilbur (TV series), a children's TV show on Kids' CBC
 Wilbur Chocolate Company, a chocolate company based in Lititz, Pennsylvania
 Wilbur Dam, a hydroelectric dam on the Watauga River, Tennessee
 Wilbur Theatre, a historic theatre in Boston, Massachusetts

See also
 Wilber (disambiguation)
 Wilbor (disambiguation)
 Wilbour
 Samuel Wilbore (1595–1656), early Rhode Island settler
 Justice Wilbur (disambiguation)